Cryptocarya cunninghamii is a tree in the family Lauraceae. Found in protected sites and rainforest in northern Australia, the coconut laurel has an aromatic scent, and attracts birds and butterflies.

References

Flora of Western Australia
Flora of Queensland
Trees of Australia
cunninghamii
Laurales of Australia
Flora of the Northern Territory